is a passenger railway station in located in the city of Yokkaichi,  Mie Prefecture, Japan, operated by the private railway operator Kintetsu Railway.

Lines
Kasumigaura Station is served by the Nagoya Line, and is located 33.5 rail kilometers from the starting point of the line at Kintetsu Nagoya Station.

Station layout
The station consists of two opposed side platforms, connected by a level crossing.

Platforms

Adjacent stations

History
The original Kasumigaura Station was a provisional station located 500 meters away in the direction of Nagoya, October 28 of the same year. and was opened on The Ise Railway became the Sangu Express Electric Railway's Ise Line on September 15, 1936 at which time the original Kasumigaura Station was elevated in status to that of a full station. The line was renamed the Nagoya Line on December 7, 1938. After merging with Osaka Electric Kido on March 15, 1941, the line became the Kansai Express Railway's Nagoya Line. The original Kasumigaura Station was closed on October 23, 1943. The Kansai Express was merged with the Nankai Electric Railway on June 1, 1944 to form Kintetsu. Hazu Station was renamed to its present name on June 5, 1950.

Passenger statistics
In fiscal 2019, the station was used by an average of 2142 passengers daily (boarding passengers only).

Surrounding area
Yokkaichi Dome

See also
List of railway stations in Japan

References

External links

 Kintetsu: Kasumigaura Station

Railway stations in Japan opened in 1929
Railway stations in Mie Prefecture
Stations of Kintetsu Railway
Yokkaichi